Ten Speed may refer to:

 10 Speed (album), album by Canadian band Mystery Machine (band)
 Road bicycle—10-speed is a 1970s American term describing road racing bicycles (using a derailleur) with 10 total gearing combinations, or speeds.
 Ten Speed Press
 Ten Speed (Of God's Blood and Burial)
 Tenspeed and Brown Shoe